Pendennis may refer to:

 Pendennis, a novel by the English author Thackeray.
 Pendennis Castle, a castle in Cornwall.
 RMS Pendennis Castle, a ship.
 GWR 4073 Class 4079 Pendennis Castle, a steam locomotive.
 Pendennis Club, a private club in Louisville, Kentucky.
 Pendennis, a town in Kansas, United States.
 HMS Pendennis (1679), a British warship.
 HMS Pendennis (1695), a British warship.